The Taipei Cultural Mosque is a mosque in Zhongzheng District, Taipei, Taiwan. The mosque is the third one to be built in Taiwan and it is owned by the Chinese Muslim Youth League. It also houses the Taiwan Halal Integrity Development Association.

History

First building
Taipei Cultural Mosque was built in 1950 at Roosevelt Road by Xiao Yongtai (蕭永泰) or Akhond Hsiao from Northwest China. The mosque was initially located at Xiao's Japanese-style house. His main thought was to spread Islam through cultural movement, thus he also reestablished the Chinese Muslim Youth League. Due to the road widening scheme on Roosevelt Road, the mosque had to be relocated to its current location near the old location at Xinhai Road (辛亥路). The old mosque building had to be torn down for the road construction work.

Current building
The new building of Taipei Cultural Mosque was designed by architect Huang Mo-chun. Nevertheless, the new mosque went through several renovations, in which it was rebuilt into its current five-story building in 1983. By then, the mosque was inaugurated during a ceremony attended by the Ambassador of Saudi Arabia to the Republic of China, Asaad Abdul Aziz AI-Zuhair. In 1990, Xiao died and his son, Xiao Weijun (蕭偉君) assumed the imam position left by his father. Another renovation was made again in the same year with the help of Indonesia Economic and Trade Office to Taipei, and the latest renovation was made in April 2010.

Architecture

The five-story building of Taipei Cultural Mosque is a combination of Islamic traditional culture and modern architecture. Now the building has become the hub for religious and cultural activities for Muslims in Taiwan.

Transportation

Taipei Cultural Mosque is accessible within walking distance South from Taipower Building Station of Taipei Metro.

See also
 Islam in Taiwan
 Chinese Muslim Association
 List of mosques in Taiwan

References

1950 establishments in Taiwan
Mosques completed in 1982
Mosques in Taipei
Rebuilt buildings and structures in Taiwan